The 1997–98 NBA season was the tenth season for the Charlotte Hornets in the National Basketball Association. During the off-season, the Hornets signed free agents David Wesley, and Bobby Phills, while re-signing former Hornets forward J.R. Reid. Early into the season, the team traded long-time Hornets guard Muggsy Bogues, along with second-year guard Tony Delk to the Golden State Warriors in exchange for B. J. Armstrong, who won three championships with the Chicago Bulls in the early 1990s. At midseason, the team signed free agent Vernon Maxwell, who was previously released by the Orlando Magic, as the Hornets held a 29–18 record at the All-Star break. Despite injuries to Phills, Vlade Divac and long-time original Hornet Dell Curry, the Hornets had another stellar season posting a ten-game winning streak between February and March, winning 15 of 16 games between February 21 and March 26. The Hornets finished the season third in the Central Division with a 51–31 record, and qualified for their fourth playoff appearance.

Glen Rice led the team in scoring with 22.3 points per game, and was named to the All-NBA Third Team, and selected for the 1998 NBA All-Star Game, while Wesley averaged 13.0 points, 6.5 assists and 1.7 steals per game, and Anthony Mason provided the team with 12.8 points and 10.2 rebounds per game. In addition, Phills contributed 10.4 points per game, while Divac averaged 10.4 points, 8.1 rebounds and 1.5 blocks per game, Matt Geiger provided with 11.3 points and 6.7 rebounds per game, and Curry contributed 9.4 points per game off the bench in only 52 games.

In the playoffs, the Hornets defeated the Atlanta Hawks, 3–1 in the Eastern Conference First Round, but were eliminated 1–4 by Michael Jordan, Scottie Pippen and the 2-time defending champion Chicago Bulls in the Eastern Conference Semi-finals, despite winning Game 2 at the United Center, 78–76. The Bulls went on to reach the NBA Finals, where they defeated the Utah Jazz in six games to win their sixth championship in eight years. The Hornets finished second in the NBA in home-game attendance for the season behind the Bulls. On November 25, 1997, the team's sellout streak would end at 364 consecutive games (371 including post-season contests); this was the second longest active sell-out streak at the time, behind the Bulls' 465.

Following the season, Divac and Maxwell both signed as free agents with the Sacramento Kings, while Curry signed with the Milwaukee Bucks, and Geiger signed with the Philadelphia 76ers. For the season, the Hornets added side panels and additional pinstripes to their uniforms, which remained in use until 2002.

Offseason

NBA Draft

The Hornets had no draft picks in 1997.

Roster

Regular season

Season standings

Record vs. opponents

Game log

Playoffs

|- align="center" bgcolor="#ccffcc"
| 1
| April 23
| Atlanta
| W 97–87
| Glen Rice (34)
| Divac, Mason (7)
| David Wesley (12)
| Charlotte Coliseum19,176
| 1–0
|- align="center" bgcolor="#ccffcc"
| 2
| April 25
| Atlanta
| W 92–85
| Anthony Mason (25)
| Glen Rice (13)
| Divac, Wesley (6)
| Charlotte Coliseum20,390
| 2–0
|- align="center" bgcolor="#ffcccc"
| 3
| April 28
| @ Atlanta
| L 64–96
| Anthony Mason (12)
| Vlade Divac (7)
| Divac, Wesley (5)
| Georgia Dome19,745
| 2–1
|- align="center" bgcolor="#ccffcc"
| 4
| May 1
| @ Atlanta
| W 91–82
| Anthony Mason (29)
| Anthony Mason (14)
| David Wesley (10)
| Georgia Dome22,074
| 3–1

|- align="center" bgcolor="#ffcccc"
| 1
| May 3
| @ Chicago
| L 70–83
| Glen Rice (25)
| Vlade Divac (14)
| David Wesley (9)
| United Center23,844
| 0–1
|- align="center" bgcolor="#ccffcc"
| 2
| May 6
| @ Chicago
| W 78–76
| Mason, Curry (15)
| Vlade Divac (19)
| Mason, Rice (4)
| United Center23,844
| 1–1
|- align="center" bgcolor="#ffcccc"
| 3
| May 8
| Chicago
| L 89–103
| Glen Rice (31)
| Vlade Divac (13)
| David Wesley (8)
| Charlotte Coliseum23,799
| 1–2
|- align="center" bgcolor="#ffcccc"
| 4
| May 10
| Chicago
| L 80–94
| Vlade Divac (15)
| Glen Rice (9)
| Anthony Mason (5)
| Charlotte Coliseum23,799
| 1–3
|- align="center" bgcolor="#ffcccc"
| 5
| May 13
| @ Chicago
| L 84–93
| Glen Rice (30)
| Vlade Divac (15)
| three players tied (5)
| United Center23,844
| 1–4

Player statistics

Season

Playoffs

Awards and records
 Glen Rice, All-NBA Third Team

Transactions
 July 1, 1997

Released Rafael Addison.

Signed David Wesley as a free agent.
 July 16, 1997

Signed J.R. Reid as a free agent.
 August 19, 1997

Signed Bobby Phills as a free agent.

Released Malik Rose.

Waived Ricky Pierce.
 September 10, 1997

Signed Tony Farmer as a free agent.

Signed Travis Williams as a free agent.
 October 2, 1997

Signed Corey Beck as a free agent.
 November 7, 1997

Traded Muggsy Bogues and Tony Delk to the Golden State Warriors for B. J. Armstrong.
 January 16, 1998

Signed Donald Royal to the first of two 10-day contracts.
 January 22, 1998

Signed Michael McDonald as a free agent.
 February 2, 1998

Signed Jeff Grayer to a 10-day contract.

Signed Vernon Maxwell to a 10-day contract.
 February 4, 1998

Signed Donald Royal to a contract for the rest of the season.
 February 13, 1998

Signed Vernon Maxwell to a contract for the rest of the season.
 March 24, 1998

Waived Tony Farmer.

Player Transactions Citation:

References

 Hornets on Database Basketball
 Hornets on Basketball Reference

Charlotte Hornets seasons
Char
Charlotte Hornets
Charlotte Hornets